Gerald Collins (25 April 1932 – 7 November 2003) was  a former Australian rules footballer who played with Richmond in the Victorian Football League (VFL).

Notes

External links 
		

1932 births
2003 deaths
Australian rules footballers from Victoria (Australia)
Richmond Football Club players